The 2018–19 Perth Glory FC W-League season was the club's eleventh season in the W-League.

Players

Squad information
Updated October 27, 2018

Transfers in

Transfers out

W-League

League table

Fixtures

Finals Series

Results summary

Results by round

References

External links
 Official Website

Perth Glory FC (A-League Women) seasons